Rildo is a male given name. It may refer to:

 Rildo (footballer, born 1942) (1942–2021), Rildo da Costa Menezes, Brazilian football defender
 Rildo (footballer, born 1989), Rildo de Andrade Felicissimo, Brazilian football forward
 Rildo (footballer, born 2000), Rildo Gonçalves de Amorim Filho, Brazilian football attacking midfielder for Santa Clara